Samsung Galaxy A3 (2016) or Samsung Galaxy A3 2016 Edition is an Android smartphone produced by Samsung Electronics. It was introduced on 2 December 2015, along with Galaxy A5 (2016), Galaxy A7 (2016), and Galaxy A9 (2016).

Hardware
The 2016-release Galaxy A3 is equipped with the Exynos 7580 system-on-chip, which has two clusters of four cores, but Samsung decided to lock one cluster for unknown reasons. The device has the same CPU as Galaxy A5 (2016), or Qualcomm Snapdragon 410 in select markets, both of which feature a processor with four ARM Cortex-A53 cores accompanied by a Mali-T720MP2 GPU. The smartphone has 1.5 GB of RAM and 16 GB of internal storage, with support for removable MicroSD cards of up to 128 GB. The device's MicroSD card slot has been designed to allow insertion of a SIM card, and thus Galaxy A3 (2016) can also be used in Dual SIM mode.

In Japan, it is exclusively sold as Samsung Galaxy Feel, with 3 GB of RAM and 32 GB of internal storage, with support for removable MicroSD cards of up to 256 GB, as well as a Samsung Exynos 7870 processor, Android 7.0 Nougat with Samsung Experience UI and IP68 rating for water and dust resistance.

Design
Samsung Galaxy A3 (2016) has an aluminium and glass body, unlike Samsung Galaxy A3, the A3 (2016) has a larger  display compared to the  display of predecessor Galaxy A3. The A3 (2016)’s display is protected by Corning Gorilla Glass 4, also on the back side of the phone.

Availability
The Galaxy A3 (2016) was released in China on 15 December 2015, followed by other countries in the 1st Quarter of 2016. As of April 2016, this model is available in Europe, Africa, Latin America and Asia. It is not available in North America and India; there, only Galaxy A5 (2016) and Galaxy A7 (2016) are available.

Variants

See also
Related Samsung Galaxy phone models:
Galaxy Alpha

References

External links
 Samsung Official Product Page
 GSMArena

Samsung smartphones
Samsung Galaxy
Android (operating system) devices
Mobile phones introduced in 2015
Discontinued smartphones